Dom Rémy (or Rémi) Ceillier (1688 – 1761) was a Benedictine monk of the Lorraine Congregation of St. Vanne.

Biography 
Rémy Ceillier was born in Bar-le-Duc, and was the compiler of an immense Histoire générale des auteurs sacrés et ecclésiastiques (23 vols., Paris, 1729–1763), a history and analysis of the writings of ecclesiastical writers of the first thirteen centuries. A later and improved edition in 14 volumes was produced in Paris in 1858. Ceillier's other work, Apologie de la morale des Pères de l'Église (Paris, 1718), also won fame.

The most valuable portion of Ceillier's Histoire généale des auteurs sacrés et ecclésiastiques is that dealing with the Church fathers of the first six centuries. Here the author was able to draw upon the writings of Louis-Sébastien Le Nain de Tillemont and use the scholarly Benedictine editions of the Church fathers. Charges of Jansenism made against Ceillier in his lifetime and afterwards find no substantiation in his writings, and the treatment accorded to the author and his works by Pope Benedict XIV shows that the pope had no doubts as to his orthodoxy.

References

1688 births
1791 deaths
People from Bar-le-Duc
18th-century French historians
French Benedictines
French male non-fiction writers
18th-century French male writers